HC Lipetsk is an ice hockey team in Lipetsk, Russia. They play in the Pervaya Liga, the third level of Russian ice hockey. The club was founded in 1979. They played in the Russian Superleague from 1998-2000.

Achievements
Vysshaya Liga champion: 1998.

External links
 Official site

Ice hockey teams in Russia
Ice hockey clubs established in 1979
Sport in Lipetsk